Avidar is a surname. Notable people with the surname include:

Eli Avidar (born 1964), Israeli businessman, diplomat, and politician
Yemima Avidar-Tchernovitz (1909–1998), Israeli author

See also
Avidan